Expectations is the second studio album by the New Zealand band the Dance Exponents, released in 1985. The album peaked at #7 and spent eight weeks on the New Zealand Album chart. The album was released on CD in 1999 with three extra tracks but has since been deleted. In May 2013, Universal Music re-released the album digitally in New Zealand in remastered standard and deluxe editions. The deluxe edition has six additional tracks of singles, B-sides, rarities and demos.

Track listing
"These Oceans Wave & Tide Us In" (Jones/Luck)
"Christchurch (In Cashel St. I Wait)" (Gent/Jones/Luck)
"Running, Running Through The Rainforest" (Luck)
"Prayers Be Answered" (Luck)
"Ashend Ashend Autumn Leaves" (Luck/Sheehan)
"Only I Could Die (And Love You Still)" (Luck/Sheehan)
"Weeping Soul" (Luck)
"Losing The Sun, the Moon and You" (Luck)
"My Love For You" (Jones/Luck)
"Skies Of Sunset" (Luck)
"Greater Hopes, Greater Expectations" (Luck)

Additional tracks on 2013 digital deluxe edition:
"Sex & Agriculture" (Jones/Luck)
"Christchurch (In Cashel St. I Wait)" (extended 12" mix) (Gent/Jones/Luck)
"Sex & Agriculture (extended 12" mix)" (Jones/Luck)
"There's Only One Love For This Love" (demo) (Luck)
"My Love For You" (Jones/Luck)
"Sex & Agriculture" (instrumental) (Jones/Luck)

Personnel
Jordan Luck (vocals)
Brian Jones (guitar/vocals)
David Gent (bass guitar)
Chris Sheehan (guitars/piano/bass guitar)

Additional musician
Vince Ely (drums)

Production credits
Produced and engineered by Ian (Fab) Taylor
Engineered by Tim Field and Guy Gray
Recorded at Mandrill Studios, Auckland, New Zealand
Mixed at 301 Studios, Sydney, Australia
Cover Painting: Nikko Chunn
Photography: Phillip Peacock
Layout: 20/20

Charts

References 

1985 albums
The Exponents albums